Songdowŏn station is a railway station in greater Wŏnsan city, Kangwŏn province, North Korea, on the Songdowŏn Line of the Korean State Railway.

The station serves the Songdowŏn International Children's Union Camp.

References

Railway stations in North Korea